Thelepus is a genus of polychaetes belonging to the family Terebellidae.

The genus has cosmopolitan distribution.

Species
Species:

Thelepus abranchiatus 
Thelepus abyssorum 
Thelepus alatus 
Thelepus ambitus 
Thelepus angustitoris 
Thelepus antarcticus 
Thelepus australiensis 
Thelepus binakayanensis
Thelepus binakayensis 
Thelepus boja 
Thelepus branchiatus 
Thelepus brevicauda 
Thelepus brevitori 
Thelepus cincinnatus 
Thelepus corsicanus 
Thelepus crassibranchiatus 
Thelepus crispus 
Thelepus davehalli 
Thelepus dubius 
Thelepus extensus 
Thelepus fraggleorum 
Thelepus haitiensis 
Thelepus hamatus 
Thelepus hemeiensis 
Thelepus japonicus 
Thelepus laeviseta 
Thelepus leptoplocamus 
Thelepus longtongensis 
Thelepus malayensis 
Thelepus marenzelleri 
Thelepus marthae 
Thelepus mcintoshi 
Thelepus megalabiatum 
Thelepus microbranchiatus 
Thelepus natans 
Thelepus nucleolata 
Thelepus opimus 
Thelepus paiderotos 
Thelepus parapari 
Thelepus parcus 
Thelepus pascua 
Thelepus paucibranchis 
Thelepus pequenianus 
Thelepus pericensis 
Thelepus praecox 
Thelepus pulvinus 
Thelepus robustus 
Thelepus setosus 
Thelepus taamensis 
Thelepus taiwanensis 
Thelepus tenuis 
Thelepus thoracicus 
Thelepus toyamaensis 
Thelepus triserialis 
Thelepus vaughani 
Thelepus verrilli 
Thelepus wuchiensis

References

Polychaetes